Jin'an Town is a town and the county seat of Songpan County in the Ngawa Tibetan and Qiang Autonomous Prefecture of Sichuan, China. The town is situated on the Min River and famous for its Songpan Ancient Town.

Township-level divisions of Sichuan